Brahma Temple is a 7,551-foot-elevation (2,302 meter) summit located in the Grand Canyon, in Coconino County of Arizona, US. Its nearest higher neighbor is Oza Butte, four miles to the north-northwest. Other neighbors include Zoroaster Temple one mile to the south, and Deva Temple, 1.5 miles to the north. Brahma Temple is named for Brahma, the Hindu creator of the universe. This name was applied by Clarence Dutton who began the tradition of naming geographical features in the Grand Canyon after mythological deities. This geographical feature's name was officially adopted in 1906 by the U.S. Board on Geographic Names.

The first ascent of the summit was made by Donald Davis and Clarence "Doc" Ellis on May 15, 1968. The pair covered 12 miles and climbed 5,071 vertical feet from Phantom Ranch to reach the summit, and returned in 14 hours to complete the accomplishment. According to the Köppen climate classification system, Brahma Temple is located in a Cold semi-arid climate zone.

Geology

The summit of Brahma Temple is composed of cream-colored, cliff-forming, Permian Coconino Sandstone with a Kaibab Limestone caprock. The sandstone, which is the third-youngest of the strata in the Grand Canyon, was deposited 265 million years ago as sand dunes. Below the Coconino Sandstone is slope-forming, Permian Hermit Formation, which in turn overlays the Pennsylvanian-Permian Supai Group, and further down the Mississippian Redwall Limestone layer. Precipitation runoff from Brahma Temple drains south into the Colorado River via Bright Angel Creek on its west side, and Clear Creek on the east side.

Gallery

See also
 Geology of the Grand Canyon area

References

External links 

 Weather forecast: National Weather Service
 Donald Davis on summit (first ascent photo)
 Brahma Temple photo by Harvey Butchart

Grand Canyon
Landforms of Coconino County, Arizona
Mountains of Arizona
Mountains of Coconino County, Arizona
North American 2000 m summits
Colorado Plateau
Grand Canyon National Park
Sandstone formations of the United States